Dayon Demond Mallet (born February 22, 1978) is a retired American professional basketball player. He played college basketball at McNeese State University. Mallet spent 17 seasons as a professional player, in multiple European leagues afterwards, and won multiple championships and was named the Most Valuable Player of several competitions.

Mallet won a German League championship, and the German Cup title. He also won the ULEB Cup championship (which is now called the EuroCup), and he won the prestigious Spanish King's Cup title, with the team Joventut Badalona. Joventut later honored Mallet in his last game with the team. Mallet also won the Belgian League MVP in 2011, and the Belgium League championship that same year.

High school
Mallet attended Leesville High, in Leesville, Louisiana, where he played high school basketball.

College career
After high school, Mallet enrolled at McNeese State University, where he played college basketball with the McNeese State Cowboys. He was an NCAA Division I All-American Honorable Mention in 2001. He was also named the Southland Conference's Player of the Year, of the 2000–01 season. Mallet was inducted in the McNeese State University Hall of Fame in 2012.

Professional career
After college, Mallett played in the 2001 NBA Summer League, with the Detroit Pistons' summer league squad. He also played in the 2002 NBA Summer League, with the summer league squad of the Boston Celtics. Mallet played several years in Germany, in the Bundesliga, the country's premier basketball league, but later moved to Spain, and then Turkey; and in 2010, Belgium, where he signed a two-year contract, to reportedly become the highest-paid player in Belgium at the time.

In December 2011, he moved from the Belgium club, during the 2011–12 season, where he was rated as one of the best point guards in the EuroLeague that season, to Maccabi Tel Aviv, in Israel, with whom he signed a one-year contract. In April 2012, after not getting enough playing time in the rotation of Maccabi Tel Aviv, he returned to Spirou Charleroi, through the end of the 2011–12 season. The following year, Mallet signed a two-year deal with the Artland Dragons, which was rumored to be the largest contract ever given to a point guard in the German Basketball League. He returned to Spirou again, after that season, and then became a player of FIATC Joventut, where he worked as a player-coach. Mallet was honored by Joventut, at the club's arena, on May 22, 2016, with a banner and retirement of his jersey, for all of his accomplishments with the club.

On January 10, 2017, Mallet signed with the French club SLUC Nancy, for the rest of the 2016–17 Pro A season. After last playing in 2017, he officially announced his retirement from playing professional basketball, in February 2018, and on February 23, 2018, Mallet was honored in ceremony by Brose Bamberg, the club he helped win their first championship to enter the Euroleague.

Awards and accomplishments

College
Southland Player of the Year: (2001)
All-American Honorable Mention: (2001)

Professional
5× German League All-Star: (2002, 2004, 2005, 2006, 2007)
German League Champion: (2005)
German League All-Star Game MVP: (2007)
German Cup Winner: (2007) 
German Cup MVP: (2007) 
Spanish King's Cup Winner: (2008)
EuroCup Champion: (2008)
Belgian League MVP: (2011)
Belgian League Champion: (2011)
Israeli State Cup Winner: (2012)

Personal

References

External links
Demond Mallett at euroleague.net
Demond Mallett at fibaeurope.com
Demond Mallett at acb.com 
Demond Mallett at eurobasket.com

1978 births
Living people
African-American basketball players
American expatriate basketball people in Belgium
American expatriate basketball people in France
American expatriate basketball people in Germany
American expatriate basketball people in Israel
American expatriate basketball people in Spain
American expatriate basketball people in Turkey
Artland Dragons players
Basketball Löwen Braunschweig players
Basketball players from Louisiana
Brose Bamberg players
Joventut Badalona players
Köln 99ers players
Liga ACB players
Maccabi Tel Aviv B.C. players
McNeese Cowboys basketball players
People from Leesville, Louisiana
Point guards
Shooting guards
SLUC Nancy Basket players
Spirou Charleroi players
Türk Telekom B.K. players
American men's basketball players
21st-century African-American sportspeople
20th-century African-American sportspeople